Quentin Joseph Reuben William Jordan MacDonald (born 25 September 1988) is a New Zealand rugby union player who currently plays for  in the Bunnings NPC and the  in Super Rugby. His position is hooker.

Early life 
Born in Blenheim, MacDonald was educated at Marlborough Boys' College and played for the school's top side in 2005 and 2006.

Tasman 
He returned to the Mako ahead of the 2020 Mitre 10 Cup. MacDonald played 11 games and scored 3 tries for the side in the 2020 season as they went on to win the competition for the second time in a row. MacDonald became only the third player to play 100 games for the province during the 2021 Bunnings NPC in the final against , the Mako however could not get across the line, losing 23–20.

Super Rugby 
He made the move north to the  ahead of the 2013 Super Rugby season. MacDonald returned to the Blues for the 2016 Super Rugby season finishing his time at the side with 20 matches. He made his Super Rugby return for the Crusaders in Round 3 of the 2023 Super Rugby Pacific season against the  where he started and scored 2 tries in a loss for the Crusaders.

Overseas 
MacDonald signed with Irish side  on a three-month contract in 2014 where he played 3 games. He spent five seasons with the side playing a total of 100 games.

International 
MacDonald played for the New Zealand national under-20 rugby union team in 2008, playing 5 games. He made the Māori All Blacks in 2012 and played 3 games but didn't make the team again until 2015 where he played another 2 games.

References 

1988 births
Living people
Blues (Super Rugby) players
Chiefs (rugby union) players
Crusaders (rugby union) players
Māori All Blacks players
Munster Rugby players
New Zealand rugby union players
Oyonnax Rugby players
People educated at Marlborough Boys' College
Rugby union hookers
Rugby union players from Blenheim, New Zealand
Tasman rugby union players